Jesse Shimba Luketa (born January 15, 1999) is a Canadian-born professional gridiron football outside linebacker for the Arizona Cardinals of the National Football League (NFL). He played college football at Penn State.

Early life and high school career
Luketa was born in Edmonton, Alberta and grew up in the Ottawa's Heron Gate neighborhood. He was raised in a single parent household by his mother, who immigrated to Canada from the Democratic Republic of the Congo. When Luketa was 14 years old, he enrolled at Mercyhurst Preparatory School in Erie, Pennsylvania for his final three years of high school. Luketa was rated a four-star recruit and committed to play college football at Penn State from over 40 scholarship offers.

College career
Luketa played mostly on special teams during his freshman season. He saw more significant playing time as a sophomore, and made 24 tackles with four passes broken up. Luketa was selected as a team captain going into his junior year and finished the season second on the team with 59 tackles along with 2.5 tackles for loss, a fumble recovery and three passes broken up. Luketa played both linebacker and defensive end as a senior, and was named to the third-team All-Big Ten Conference. Following the end of the season, he declared that he would be entering the 2022 NFL Draft.

College Statistics

Professional career

Luketa was drafted in the final round (256th overall) of the 2022 NFL Draft by the Arizona Cardinals. He was ranked as the #2 Canadian prospect ahead of the 2022 CFL Draft, where he was drafted in the second round (20th overall) by the Ottawa Redblacks as a territorial draft pick. He was waived on August 30, 2022, and signed to the practice squad the next day. He was promoted to the active roster on September 27.

Following Week 16 of the 2022 NFL season, Luketa underwent dental surgery; upon learning about teammate J. J. Watt's retirement announcement, Luketa attempted to contact Watt (who was unaware that it was Luketa contacting him). Luketa, with cottonballs and slurred speech after surgery, sent a photo and voice memo to Watt requesting a signed jersey at the end of the season, which both later joked about in the press.

References

External links
 Arizona Cardinals bio
Penn State Nittany Lions bio

1999 births
Living people
Canadian people of Democratic Republic of the Congo descent
Black Canadian players of American football
American football defensive ends
Penn State Nittany Lions football players
Sportspeople from Edmonton
American football linebackers
Arizona Cardinals players
Gridiron football people from Alberta